The Blinkins were toys manufactured by the American toy-company LJN and launched in 1985.

They were magical fireflies creatures who come from the planet Blinkin land who had small wings which lit up and glowed in rainbow colours when their bodies were squeezed.

Along with the plush dolls Blinkins were small dolls, playsets, accessories, books and videos. The small versions each came with a pet or accessory and a butterfly comb.

Tagline
 Let their love light shine!

Characters

Plush Dolls
 Baby Glimmer
 Baby Glisten
 Baby Shimmer

Small Dolls
 Blink - came with Carrie - pet caterpillar
 Flashy - came with Swing accessory
 Flicker - came with Lazy Day Green Leaf Rocker accessory
 Shady - came with Buzz - pet bug
 Sparkle - came with pet bug
 Baby Twinkle - came with Lacy Leaf Cradle accessory

Blinkins Friends & Foe Dolls
 Mr Ben The Owl
 Grog the Frog

External links
 1986 Baby Blinkins television advertisement

Stuffed toys
1980s toys
Products introduced in 1985